Eden is a census-designated place in Weber County, Utah, United States. It is home to Powder Mountain ski resort. It lies between the North and Middle Fork of the Ogden River, north of Pineview Reservoir, in the Ogden Valley. The population was 600 at the 2010 census. It has a post office with the ZIP code 84310. Eden is part of the Ogden–Clearfield, Utah Metropolitan Statistical Area, as well as the Ogden Valley census county division

History
The first home here was a log cabin built in 1857 for summer herdsmen Erastus Bingham and Joseph Hardy. A community was established in 1859 when fifteen families moved in via North Ogden Canyon and Pass. The settlers hired a government surveyor, Washington Jenkins, to plot the town. Jenkins said he thought the area was one of the most beautiful sites he had ever surveyed and suggested the biblical name "Eden". An earlier temporary name was North Fork Town.

Demographics
As of the census of 2010, there were 600 people living in the CDP. There were 204 housing units. The racial makeup of the town was 95.8% White, 1.0% Black or African American, 0.2% American Indian and Alaska Native, 0.5% Asian, 0.3% Native Hawaiian and Other Pacific Islander, 1.0% some other race, and 1.2% from two or more races. Hispanic or Latino of any race were 3.2% of the population.

Notable people
David Eccles was born in Paisley, Scotland to William and Sarah Hutchinson Eccles. In 1863 his family moved from Glasgow to the United States of America, sailing on the Cynosure[1] and eventually settling in Ogden Valley located in eastern Weber County, Utah. The move was made because of their joining The Church of Jesus Christ of Latter-day Saints and their desire to be near the body of the church. The Eccles family homesteaded in Eden, Utah in 1864.

Taylor Booth (born May 31, 2001) American soccer player who plays as a midfielder for Eredivisie club Utrecht.

See also

 List of census-designated places in Utah

References

External links

Census-designated places in Weber County, Utah
Census-designated places in Utah
Ogden–Clearfield metropolitan area
Populated places established in 1857
1857 establishments in Utah Territory